Bangalore Diocese is a diocese of the Malankara Orthodox Syrian Church also known as Indian Orthodox Church located in Bangalore, Karnataka.

History
The diocese came into existence from 1 April 2009 from the Madras Diocese. The Diocese was administered by the Catholicose and assisted by H.G. Abraham Mar Epiphanios, Metropolitan of Sultan Battery Diocese as the Assistant Metropolitan of Bangalore Diocese. H.G. Dr. Abraham Mar Seraphim is the first Metropolitan of the Bangalore Diocese who took in-charge on 15-08-2010.

The area covered by the diocese include the state of Karnataka, Andhra Pradesh and 3 parishes from Gulf. The Diocese has two Mission Projects one at Eluru in Andhra Pradesh and one at Bilikere in Karnataka

Metropolitans 
Metropolitans 

1)H.H Baselios Marthoma Didymos 1 (2009-2010) 

2)H.G Puthenveettil Dr. Abraham Mar Seraphim(2010-present) 

Assistant Metropolitans

1)H.G Vattamparambil Dr. Abraham Mar Epiphanios (2009-2010)

List of parishes

Karnataka
 St. Gregorios Orthodox Cathedral, Bangalore
 St. George Orthodox Church (Georgian Pilgrim Center) Indiranagar 2nd Stage, Bangalore
 Mar Yuhanon Mamdana Orthodox Church, Krishna Rajapuram, Bangalore
 St. Thomas Orthodox Church, Banasawadi, Bangalore
 Mar Gregorios Orthodox Church, Hebbal, Bangalore
 St. Dionysius Orthodox Church, Dasarahalli, Bangalore
 St. Baselios Orthodox Church, Marthahalli, Bangalore
 St. Stephen's Orthodox Church, Vijayanagar, Bangalore
 St. Gregorios Orthodox Church, Mathikere, Bangalore
 St. Mary's Orthodox Valiyapally, Gangamma Circle, Jalahalli, Bangalore
 St. Mary's Orthodox Church, Begur, Bangalore
 St. Gregorios Orthodox Church, Nazarbad, Mysore
 St. Gregorios Orthodox Church, Tumkur

Andhra Pradesh and Telangana
 St. Gregorios Orthodox Cathedral, Hyderabad
 St. George Orthodox Church, Jeedimetla, Hyderabad
 St. Mary's Orthodox Church, Ramachandrapuram, Hyderabad
 St. Andrew's Valiyapally Orthodox Church, West Marredpally, Secunderabad
 St. George Orthodox Church, West Godavari
 St. Stephen's Orthodox Church, Vishakapattanam

UAE
 St. Gregorios Orthodox Church, Fujarigh
 St. Gregorios Orthodox Congregation, Dibba 
 St. Mary's Orthodox Church, Ras-Al-Khaima

Notes

References
 Bangalore Diocese
 Malankara Orthodox Syrian Church

Malankara Orthodox Syrian Church dioceses
Christian organizations established in 2009
Organisations based in Bangalore
2009 establishments in Karnataka